

The small bird genus Geronticus belongs to the ibis subfamily (Threskiornithinae). Its name is derived from the Greek gérontos (γέρωντος, "old man") in reference to the bald head of these dark-plumaged birds; in English they are called bald ibises.

The genus was erected by the German naturalist Johann Georg Wagler in 1832. The type species was subsequently designated as the southern bald ibis (Geronticus calvus).

Species

Like most ibises, they are gregarious long-legged wading birds with long down-curved bills; they form one subfamily of the Threskiornithidae, the other subfamily being the spoonbills. The two Geronticus species differ from other ibises in that they have unfeathered faces and heads, breed on cliffs rather than in trees, and prefer arid habitats to the wetlands used by their relatives. Their food contains fewer aquatic animals and more terrestrial ones; they are known to gather together and feed on locust swarms, killing many of these notorious pests. This has also contributed to their decline however, as they were much affected by indiscriminate pesticide spraying in the mid-to-late 20th century, leading to their disappearance from many regions.

Fossil record
Geronticus perplexus is by far the oldest fossil assigned to the present genus. It is known only from a piece of distal right humerus, found at Sansan, France, in Middle Miocene rocks of the Serravallian faunal stage MN 6 (about 12-14 million years ago). It was initially considered to be a heron and placed in the genera Ardea and Proardea. More plesiomorphic than the living species, it seems to represent an ancient member of the Geronticus lineage, in line with the theory that most living ibis genera seem to have evolved before 15 million years ago (mya).

Geronticus apelex is apparently the direct ancestor of the southern bald ibis. Its remains were found in Early Pliocene deposits near Langebaanweg, South Africa, which date back about five million years.

What may be an ancestral European form, Geronticus balcanicus, was found in a Late Pliocene deposit near Slivnitsa, Bulgaria. It is hitherto only known from one left and one right carpometacarpus piece (NMNHS 14 and NMNHS 453, respectively) which are almost identical to those of living bald ibises. Contemporaneous with these during the early MN18 faunal stage – about two mya – birds entirely indistinguishable from the modern northern bald ibis inhabited at least Spain, if not the whole western Mediterranean region already. Thus, the extinct species may be the immediate ancestor of G. eremita, which would have originated at the western extent of its range. Some authors even include the Bulgarian population in G. eremita, but most are more cautious. G. balcanicus may also represent a lineage related but not ancestral to the northern bald ibis, which inhabited the inland regions northeastwards of the European Alpides and – like the immediate ancestor of G. eremita in this scenario – was isolated from the ancestors of G. calvus when gene flow across tropical Africa ceased.

Footnotes

References
 Boev, Zlatozar (1998): Presence of Bald Ibises (Geronticus Wagler, 1832) (Threskiornithidae - Aves) in the Late Pliocene of Bulgaria. Geologica Balcanica 28 (1–2): 45–52.
 Boev, Zlatozar (2002):Additional Material of Geronticus balcanicus Boev, 1998, and Precision of the Age of the Type Locality. Acta Zoologica Bulgarica 52 (2): 53–58 [English with Bulgarian abstract]. full text
 Brookes, Ian (ed.) (2006): The Chambers Dictionary (9th ed.). Chambers, Edinburgh. 
 |del Hoyo, Josep; Elliott, Andrew & Sargatal, Jordi (eds.) (1992): Handbook of Birds of the World (Vol. 1: Ostrich to Ducks). Lynx Edicions, Barcelona. 
 Mlíkovský, Jirí (2002): Cenozoic Birds of the World (Part 1: Europe). Ninox Press, Prague.  PDF fulltext
 Sinclair, Ian; Hockey, Phil & Tarboton, Warwick R. (2002): SASOL Birds of Southern Africa. Struik, Cape Town 
 Snow, David W. & Perrins, Christopher M. (eds.) (1998): The Birds of the Western Palearctic (concise ed.). Oxford University Press.

External links

 Geronticus, Systema Naturae 2000 Navigate: Taxon Index, Genus Level, G 
 Bald Ibis by Adam Riley, Focusing on Wildlife

 
Bird genera
Serravallian first appearances
Extant Miocene first appearances